LitRPG, short for literary role playing game, is a  literary genre combining the conventions of computer RPGs with science-fiction and fantasy novels. The term was introduced in 2013. In LitRPG, games or game-like challenges form an essential part of the story, and visible RPG statistics (for example strength, intelligence, damage) are a significant part of the reading experience. This distinguishes the genre from novels that tie in with a game, like those set in the world of Dungeons and Dragons; books that are actual games, such as the choose-your-own-path Fighting Fantasy type of publication; or games that are literally described, like MUDs and interactive fiction. Typically, the main character in a LitRPG novel is consciously interacting with the game or game-like world and attempting to progress within it.

History 

The literary trope of getting inside a computer game is not new. Andre Norton's Quag Keep (1978) enters the world of the characters of a D&D game. Larry Niven and Steven Barnes's Dream Park (1981) has a setting of LARP-like games as a kind of reality TV in the future (2051).  With the rise of MMORPGs in the 1990s came science fiction novels that utilised virtual game worlds for their plots. Early examples are Tad Williams's 1996–2004 tetralogy Otherland, Conor Kostick's 2004 Epic and Charles Stross's 2007 Halting State. In Taiwan, the first of Yu Wo's nine ½ Prince (½ 王子 Èrfēnzhīyī Wángzǐ) novels appeared, published in October 2004 by Ming Significant Cultural. In Japan, the genre has reached the mainstream with the release of the media phenomenon Sword Art Online in 2009.  Also of note is the Korean Legendary Moonlight Sculptor series with over 50 volumes.

While these novels and others were precursors to a more stat-heavy form of novel, which is LitRPG proper, a Russian publishing initiative identified the genre and gave it a name. The first Russian novel in this style appeared in 2012 at the Russian self-publishing website samizdat.ru, the novel Господство клана Неспящих (Clan Dominance: The Sleepless Ones) by Dem Mikhailov set in the fictional sword and sorcery game world of  Valdira, printed by Leningrad Publishers later that year under the title Господство кланов (The Rule of the Clans) in the series Современный фантастический боевик (Modern Fantastic Action Novel) and translated into English as The Way of the Clan as a Kindle book in 2015. In 2013, EKSMO, Russia's major publishing house, started its multiple-author project  entitled LitRPG. According to Magic Dome Books, a major translator of Russian LitRPG, the term "LitRPG" was coined in late 2013 during a brainstorming session between writer Vasily Mahanenko, EKSMO's science fiction editor Dmitry Malkin and fellow LitRPG series editor and author . Since 2014, EKSMO has been running LitRPG competitions and publishing the winning stories.

GameLit
Many of the post-2014 writers in this field insist that depiction of a character's in-game progression must be part of the definition of LitRPG, leading to the emergence of the term GameLit to embrace stories set in a game universe but which don't necessarily embody leveling and skill raising. Some of the earliest examples are Chris Van Allsburg's 1981 Jumanji which is a children's book about a magical board game. and the Guardians of the Flame series (1983-2004) by Joel Rosenberg where a group of college students are magically transported into a fantasy role-playing game.

Ernest Cline's 2011 novel Ready Player One, which depicts a virtual reality world called OASIS filled with arcade game references from the 1980s and 1990s, became an example of this new genre. Other examples include Marie Lu's 2017 novel Warcross which is about an online bounty hunter in an internet game, and Louis Bulaong's 2020 book Escapist Dream which tells the story of a virtual reality world where geeks can role-play and use the powers of their favorite comic book, anime, movie and video game characters.

Examples 
English-language:
 Arcane Ascension (2017–) by Andrew Rowe
 Awaken Online (2016–) by Travis Bagwell
 Critical Failures: Caverns and Creatures (2012–) by Robert Bevan
 The Dark Lord Bert (2019–) by Chris Fox
 The Divine Dungeon (2016–2019) by Dakota Krout
 Dungeon Crawler Carl (2020-) by Matt Dinniman
 The Feedback Loop (2015–2018) by Harmon Cooper
 Game of Gods (2019–) by Joshua Kern 
 He Who Fights With Monsters (2021–) by Shirtaloon 
 Red Mage (2018–) by Xander Boyce
 The Wandering Inn (2016–) by pirateaba
 Worth the Candle (2017–2021) by Alexander Wales

Russian:
 Alpha Rome (2018–2019) by Ros Per (Рос Пер)
 An NPC's Path (2018–2021) by Pavel Kornev (Павел Корнев)
 The Bard from Barliona (2017–2020) by Vasily Mahanenko (Василий Маханенко) (series related to The Way of the Shaman set in Barliona)
 Clan Dominance: The Sleepless Ones (2012–2018) by Dem Mikhailov (Дем Михайлов)
 The Crow Cycle (2015–) by Dem Mikhailov (Дем Михайлов) (series set in Valdira)
 Dark Herbalist (2016–2018) by Michael Atamanov (Михаил Атаманов)
 Dark Paladin (2017–2018) by Vasily Mahanenko (Василий Маханенко)
 Fayroll (2017–) by Andrey Vasilyev (Андрей Васильев)
 Galactogon (2014–2019) by Vasily Mahanenko (Василий Маханенко)
 Heroes of the Final Frontier (2017–) by Dem Mikhailov (Дем Михайлов) (sequel series to Clan Dominance: The Sleepless Ones set in Valdira)
 In the System (2018–) by Petr Zhgulyov (Жгулёв Пётр)
 Interworld Network (2018–2020) by Dmitry Bilik (Дмитрий Билик)
 Invasion (2018–2022) by Vasily Mahanenko (Василий Маханенко) (sequel series to The Way of the Shaman set in Barliona)
 League of Losers (2020–) by Michael Atamanov (Михаил Атаманов)
 Level Up (2017–) by Dan Sugralinov (Данияр Сугралинов)
 Mirror World (2014–2022) by Alexey Osadchuk (Алексей Осадчук)
 The Neuro (2016–2018) by Andrei Livadny (Андрей Ливадный)
 Perimeter Defense (2015–2017) by Michael Atamanov (Михаил Атаманов)
 Phantom Server (2015–2016) by Andrei Livadny (Андрей Ливадный)
 Play to Live (2013–) by D. Rus (Дмитрий Рус)
 Project Stellar (2019–2022) by Roman Prokofiev (Роман Прокофьев)
 The Range (2019–2022) by Yuri Ulengov (Юрий Уленгов)
 Reality Benders (2017–) by Michael Atamanov (Михаил Атаманов)
 Respawn Trials (2018–2021) by Andrei Livadny (Андрей Ливадный)
 Rogue Merchant (2017–2019) by Roman Prokofiev (Роман Прокофьев)
 Underdog (2019–2021) by Alexey Osadchuk (Алексей Осадчук)
 The Way of the Shaman (2013–2016) by Vasily Mahanenko (Василий Маханенко)

References

Speculative fiction
Works based on video games
Fantasy genres
Science fiction genres
2013 neologisms